Jyri Marttinen (born September 1, 1982) is a Finnish ice hockey defenceman.

Career statistics

Regular season and playoffs

International

References

External links

 
 
 
 
 

1982 births
Drakkars de Caen players
Finnish ice hockey defencemen
GKS Katowice (ice hockey) players
JYP Jyväskylä players
Living people
Lukko players
Malmö Redhawks players
Lahti Pelicans players
Skellefteå AIK players
Timrå IK players
Ässät players
Calgary Flames draft picks
HC 07 Detva players
Finnish expatriate ice hockey players in Slovakia
Finnish expatriate ice hockey players in Sweden
Finnish expatriate ice hockey players in Poland
Finnish expatriate ice hockey players in France
Finnish expatriate ice hockey players in Romania